Cyrtopodium, often abbreviated Cyrt in horticulture, is a genus of more than 40 species of epiphytic and terrestrial orchids found from Florida and Mexico through Argentina. Cyrtopodium is the only genus in the monotypic subtribe Cyrtopodiinae.

The type species is C. andersonii, originally described in 1812 by A.B. Lambert as Cymbidium andersonii, and in 1813 used by Robert Brown to erect his new genus Cyrtopodium.

List of species

 Cyrtopodium aliciae L.Linden & Rolfe 
 Cyrtopodium andersonii (Lamb. ex Andrews) R.Br. in W.T.Aiton
 Cyrtopodium blanchetii Rchb.f.
 Cyrtopodium braemii L.C.Menezes 
 Cyrtopodium brandonianum Barb.Rodr.
 Cyrtopodium brunneum J.A.N.Bat. & Bianch.
 Cyrtopodium cachimboense L.C.Menezes 
 Cyrtopodium caiapoense L.C.Menezes
 Cyrtopodium cipoense L.C.Menezes 
 Cyrtopodium confusum L.C.Menezes, 2008
 Cyrtopodium cristatum Lindl. 
 Cyrtopodium dusenii Schltr.
 Cyrtopodium eugenii Rchb.f. & Warm. in H.G.Reichenbach
 Cyrtopodium flavum (Nees) Link & Otto ex Rchb.
 Cyrtopodium fowliei L.C.Menezes
 Cyrtopodium gigas (Vell.) Hoehne 
 Cyrtopodium glutiniferum Raddi
 Cyrtopodium graniticum G.A.Romero & Carnevali
 Cyrtopodium hatschbachii Pabst 
 Cyrtopodium holstii L.C.Menezes
 Cyrtopodium × intermedium Brade (C. gigas × C. glutiniferum)
 Cyrtopodium josephense Barb.Rodr. 
 Cyrtopodium kleinii J.A.N.Bat. & Bianch. 
 Cyrtopodium lamellaticallosum J.A.N.Bat. & Bianch. 
 Cyrtopodium latifolium Bianch. & J.A.N.Bat. 
 Cyrtopodium linearifolium J.A.N.Bat. & Bianch.
 Cyrtopodium lissochiloides Hoehne & Schltr. 
 Cyrtopodium longibulbosum Dodson & G.A.Romero 
 Cyrtopodium macedoi J.A.N.Bat. & Bianch. 
 Cyrtopodium macrobulbum (Lex.) G.A.Romero & Carnevali
 Cyrtopodium minutum L.C.Menezes 
 Cyrtopodium naiguatae Schltr. 
 Cyrtopodium pallidum Rchb.f. & Warm. in H.G.Reichenbach
 Cyrtopodium palmifrons Rchb.f. & Warm. in H.G.Reichenbach 
 Cyrtopodium paludicola Hoehne
 Cyrtopodium paniculatum (Ruiz & Pav.) Garay
 Cyrtopodium parviflorum Lindl.
 Cyrtopodium pflanzii Schltr.
 Cyrtopodium poecilum Rchb.f. & Warm. in H.G.Reichenbach
 Cyrtopodium punctatum (L.) Lindl.
 Cyrtopodium saintlegerianum Rchb.f.
 Cyrtopodium schargellii G.A.Romero, Aymard & Carnevali
 Cyrtopodium triste Rchb.f. & Warm. in H.G.Reichenbach 
 Cyrtopodium vernum Rchb.f. & Warm. in H.G.Reichenbach
 Cyrtopodium virescens Rchb.f. & Warm. in H.G.Reichenbach 
 Cyrtopodium willmorei Knowles & Westc. 
 Cyrtopodium witeckii L.C.Menezes, 2009
 Cyrtopodium withneri L.C.Menezes

 Names brought to synonymy
 Cyrtopodium elegans, a synonym for Tetramicra canaliculata

References

External links 

 
Cyrtopodiinae genera
Epiphytic orchids
Taxa named by Robert Brown (botanist, born 1773)